John Greyson (born March 13, 1960) is a Canadian director, writer, video artist, producer, and political activist, whose work frequently deals with queer characters and themes. He was part of a loosely-affiliated group of filmmakers to emerge in the 1980s from Toronto known as the Toronto New Wave.

Greyson has won accolades and achieved critical success with his films—most notably Zero Patience (1993) and Lilies (1996). His outspoken persona, activism, and public image have also attracted international press and controversy.

Greyson is also a professor at York University's film school, where he teaches film and video theory, film production, and editing.

Early life
Greyson was born in Nelson, British Columbia, the son of Dorothy F. (née Auterson) and Richard I. Greyson. He was raised in London, Ontario, before moving to Toronto in 1980, where he became a writer for The Body Politic and other local arts and culture magazines, as well as a video and performance artist.

Career
He directed several short films, including The Perils of Pedagogy, Kipling Meets the Cowboy and Moscow Does Not Believe in Queers, before releasing his first feature film, Pissoir, in 1988. Pissoir is a response to the homophobic climate of the period and, particularly, to police entrapment of men in public washrooms (toilets) and parks and police raids on gay bathhouses.

Greyson's next film was The Making of Monsters, a short musical film produced during Greyson's residency at the Canadian Film Centre in 1991. The film deals with the 1985 murder by five adolescent males of Kenneth Zeller, a high school teacher and librarian, when he was allegedly cruising for sexual encounters in Toronto's High Park. The film is a fictional documentary about the making of a movie-of-the-week, entitled Monsters, in which the young murderers are depicted as psychopathic monsters, rather than normal teenage boys. The film features Marxist literary critic Georg Lukács as the producer of Monsters, with Bertolt Brecht (played by a catfish) as director. Greyson's film was pulled from distribution when the estate of Kurt Weill objected to its use of the tune of Mack the Knife. Greyson had originally received copyright permission to use the tune, but it was withdrawn, apparently because Weill's estate objected to the film's homosexual themes. Although copyright is no longer an issue, having lapsed in 2000, fifty years after Weill's death, the film has not yet been re-released by the Canadian Film Development Corporation.

Greyson is best known for the feature-length films Zero Patience and Lilies. His other films include Un©ut (1997), The Law of Enclosures (1999), and Proteus (2003). He has also directed for television, including episodes of Queer as Folk, Made in Canada, and Paradise Falls.

In 2003, Greyson and composer David Wall created Fig Trees, a video opera for gallery installation, about the struggles of South African AIDS activist Zackie Achmat.  In 2009, a film version of Fig Trees was released. This film, a feature-length documentary opera, premiered at the Berlinale as part of its Panorama section, where it won the Teddy Award for Best Documentary.

In 2007, Greyson was the recipient of the Bell Award in Video Art. The award committee stated: "John Greyson is perhaps best known to a general public as a feature film director. He shoots his 'film' projects on video with trademark video post-production techniques, thus colonizing the space of cinema with the aesthetics of video. An incisive social and political critic, Mr. Greyson is in fact one of the leaders in the AIDS activist video movement, among others. Mr. Greyson has supported the practice in many ways and he influences many emerging artists."

In 2013, Greyson released Murder in Passing, a murder mystery series which aired as 30-second episodes on Pattison Outdoor Advertising's video screens in the Toronto Transit Commission subway system and as a web series.

In 2020, he released the short film Prurient as part of the Greetings from Isolation project. In 2021, his experimental short International Dawn Chorus Day had its world premiere at the Berlin International Film Festival, where it won the Teddy Award for best LGBTQ-themed short film.

Notable films

Zero Patience

Zero Patience is a 1993 musical film which challenged AIDS orthodoxy. Zero Patience is a response particularly to Randy Shilts' 1987 book And the Band Played On, which notoriously (and erroneously) traced the arrival of HIV/AIDS in North America to a single person, a Canadian airline attendant named Gaetan Dugas. Based on a single flawed epidemiological cluster study, the conclusions of Shilts' book were very problematic for the narrative of blame they created, suggesting both that particular individuals were at fault (for example, that Dugas willfully spread HIV, although he actually died before the virus was identified and the study in which he participated was one of several that allowed scientists to determine that HIV was sexually transmitted) and that monogamy and the 'normalization' of gay male sexual practices were the proper and adequate response (as opposed to a focus on safer sex practices).

Zero Patience features a gay ghost named Patient Zero who returns to Toronto to hook up with Sir Richard Francis Burton who, through an "unfortunate encounter with the fountain of youth" has lived to become the Chief Taxidermist at the Museum of Natural History. Burton is engaged in creating a "Hall of Contagion." When he loses his central exhibit, the Düsseldorf Plague Rat, he casts around for a replacement, lighting upon Patient Zero. In a comedy of errors, Zero and Burton come together, fall in love and attempt to figure out what to do about Burton's earlier attempts to defame Zero as a "sexual serial killer."

A number of sub-plots centre around specific criticisms of the social response to AIDS by politicians, doctors and pharmaceutical companies. There is a not entirely sympathetic ACT UP group engaged in a protest against the manufacturer of ZP0 (a reference to AZT), a teacher who is losing his sight to CMV and several scenes involving his students, and a number of scenes involving the animal and human inhabitants of the dioramas in the Hall of Contagion. Most of these feature lively and thought-provoking musical numbers, but none have drawn critical attention as much as the "Butthole Duet" in which Burton's and Zero's anuses sing about the social perception of anal sex and its relationship to the discourses circulating around AIDS in the 80s and early 90s. Widely misunderstood by film reviewers, the song refers to a number of academic responses to the popular perception of AIDS as a "gay disease" and the now discredited belief that the anus was more vulnerable to HIV than the vagina, particularly Leo Bersani's article "Is the Rectum a Grave?" Bersani thoroughly discredits the notion that anal sex is inherently diseased; Greyson takes this one step further to argue that an unreasonable bias against anal sex is linked to patriarchy.

The central scene in Zero Patience, however, is probably the scene in which Zero looks through a microscope at a slide of his own blood. What he sees is the subject of an Esther Williams-like song-and-dance number throughout which Zero converses with Miss HIV (Michael Callen). Both lyrically and in conversation, Miss HIV informs Zero that he was not the first, that he did not bring HIV/AIDS to North America, and that his participation in the infamous cluster study helped to prove that HIV is transmissible by sex and thus place an emphasis on safer sex that saved countless lives.

Lilies

In 1996, Greyson released his most famous film, Lilies, an adaptation of Michel Marc Bouchard's play Les feluettes, ou un drame romantique. The film screened at numerous festivals, including Sundance, and received critical acclaim; it was nominated for 14 awards Genie Awards at the 17th ceremony, winning four, including Best Picture. The film also won a number of other awards, including the GLAAD Media Award for Outstanding Film. Lilies''' romanticism, lyrical story-telling and gorgeous cinematography all combined to make the film both more accessible to 'mainstream' audiences and more popular with critics than Greyson's more controversial and more intellectually demanding works, like Zero Patience.

Following the dual chronology of Bouchard's play, Greyson's film (for which Bouchard wrote the screenplay) moves between two time periods: the film's 'present' in 1952 and the events that took place in the town of Roberval, Quebec in 1912. The film begins with a visit by Bishop Bilodeau (Marcel Sabourin) to a prison chapel where he is supposed to hear the confession of convicted murderer Simon (Aubert Pallascio). Both men were at school together in 1912 when a fire supposedly set by Simon took the life of a third schoolmate, and Simon's lover, Vallier (Danny Gilmore). However, this apparently simple story become quickly more complicated when the prison chaplain (Ian D. Clark) and the prisoners lock Bilodeau into the confessional booth and proceed to stage the true story of Vallier's death before their captive's eyes.

Greyson's directorial style is very much in evidence in Lilies. The film moves freely between realist and magic realist modes, making witty use of deceptively simple cinematic techniques, such as the way in which the camera tracks the removal of the roof of the confessional booth, apparently contained within the prison building, only to reveal the blue skies of summer-time Roberval and the arrival of the hot air balloon and its Parisian balloonist, Lydie-Anne (Alexander Chapman), which precipitates the events that lead up to Vallier's death. The narrative involves Simon's difficulties in resolving his love for Vallier in the face of homophobic Roberval (his father beats him viciously when he hears that Simon (played as a younger man by Jason Cadieux) and Valliers have been seen kissing, even though they are acting out roles in the school play), a love further complicated by the young Bilodeau's (Matthew Ferguson) tortuously repressed desire for Simon and by the sophisticated attractions of Lydie-Anne, whose femininity allows Simon to dream of a safely heterosexual future.

While the narrative, involving as it does a religious school and schoolboy sexuality, clearly has echoes of Catholic child abuse scandals, the story deliberately involves telling a story reminiscent of Mount Cashel, choosing instead to focus on the intensity and romanticism of the young men's love for each other. The narrative is enhanced by the visual style of the film, particularly the choice to cast only men in all of the roles. Of course, this makes perfect sense, since—on one level—all of the historical characters are being 'played' by the 1952 prisoners. This doubling is further enhanced by the decision to allow the male actors playing women to wear female clothing, but making no attempt whatsoever at realistic drag, relying instead on stellar performances by actors Alexander Chapman as Lydie-Anne, Brent Carver as the Countess de Tilly (Vallier's mother) and Remy Girard as the Baroness.

Fig TreesFig Trees is a feature-length documentary opera about the struggles of AIDS activists Tim McCaskell of Toronto and Zackie Achmat of Cape Town, as they fight for access to treatment drugs. In 1999, South African AIDS activist Zackie Achmat went on a treatment strike, refusing to take his pills until they were widely available to all South Africans. This symbolic act became a cause celebre, helping build his group Treatment Action Campaign into a national movement - yet with each passing month, Zackie grew sicker.

The feature film Fig Trees (2009) has been the recipient of a number of awards, including the Teddy for Best Documentary at the Berlinale, and the Best Canadian Feature award at the Toronto Inside Out Film Festival.

 Controversies 

Opposition to 2009 TIFF for highlighting of Tel Aviv
In September 2009, Greyson withdrew his short documentary, Covered, from the Toronto International Film Festival (TIFF) festival to protest the festival's inaugural City to City Spotlight on the city of Tel Aviv. In a letter to TIFF Greyson wrote that his protest "isn't against the film or filmmakers" chosen but against the City to City program, specifically, and "the smug business-as-usual aura it promotes." Greyson cited an August 2008 article in the Canadian Jewish News in which Israeli consul-general Amir Gissin stated that Israel would have a major presence at the TIFF as a culmination of his year-long Brand Israel campaign to re-engineer the country's image and that TIFF should not be a participant in such a PR exercise. Greyson also argued that "my protest isn't against the films of filmmakers you've chosen... [but] is against the Spotlight itself" and the failure of the festival to include Palestinian voices.

Greyson also wrote that he was protesting TIFF's decision "to pointedly ignore the international economic boycott campaign against Israel" and that "By ignoring this boycott, TIFF has emphatically taken sides – and in the process, forced every filmmaker and audience member who opposes the occupation to cross a type of picket line."

He cited Israel's Gaza War and the expansion of settlements as reasons for his withdrawal, accusing the festival of: "an ostrich-like indifference to the realities (cinematic and otherwise) of the region", and comparing the Spotlight on Tel Aviv to "celebrating Montgomery buses in 1963 ... Chilean wines in 1973 ... or South African fruit in 1991".

Greyson's stance and the proceeding Toronto Declaration immediately triggered international debate."Pro-Palestinian letter has uncovered debate," by Antonia Zerbisias, The Toronto Star, September 9, 2009

Criticism
Greyson's actions drew criticism from a number of sources. Cameron Bailey, one of the festival's co-directors, stated that "The City to City series was conceived and curated entirely independently. There was no pressure from any outside source. Contrary to rumours or mistaken media reports, this focus is a product only of TIFF's programming decisions. We value that independence and would never compromise it." Bailey also argued that "[Mr. Greyson] writes that his protest isn't against the films or filmmakers we have chosen, but against the spotlight itself. By that reasoning, no films programmed within this series would have met his approval, no matter what they contained." Canadian filmmaker Simcha Jacobovici argued that Greyson's letter was "full of lies" and says the festival "shouldn't be intimidated by this coalition of lies."

Columnist George Jonas, writing in the National Post, argued that Greyson was engaging in "mental gymnastics," and described Greyson's line of reasoning as follows: "Who, us, objecting to Israeli films? Perish the thought. We're only objecting to Israeli propaganda. Okay; what's Israeli propaganda? Well, the Israeli films we're objecting to." Jonas also asked rhetorically "What Israeli film wouldn't be Israeli propaganda for Greyson?" Jonas also argued "To hear [Greyson] object to "state-subsidized propaganda" is ironic, to say the least. As an activist-filmmaker, he has been a propagandist for the values of the ultra-liberal state and its shibboleths throughout his career."

Robert Lantos, a Canadian film producer, sharply criticized Greyson, stating that "the (Toronto) festival has been free from the pressure of those whose fascist agenda is to impose their views on others, stifle the voices they don't like and interfere with people's right to see whatever they wish and make up their own minds. Until now." He also suggested that Greyson is "an opportunist eagerly leaping on the 'Israel apartheid' bandwagon in order to garner more attention for his film than it would have ever received had it played at the festival."

Greyson later posted a response to Lantos that was published in Rabble.ca. Greyson stated that "From the start, our protest was against the Tel Aviv Spotlight frame, not the films – so we emphatically stressed that we weren't boycotting either the films or filmmakers, or calling on anyone else to pull their films." Greyson also criticized "the opportunism of TIFF, which seems increasingly eager to court dubious partnerships, such as the Israeli consulate's Brand Israel Campaign" and asked "the extent of Israeli sponsorship." He accused Lantos of "hiding behind...inflammatory buzzwords"

Patrick Goldstein, a film critic and columnist for the Los Angeles Times wrote that he thinks "it's especially unhealthy to ... accuse a festival of being a propaganda vehicle, as the Toronto protesters have, just because it is promoting another country's film culture. Even though I happen to agree with Greyson that the Israeli occupation and the spread of illegal settlements is a terrible thing – both for the Palestinians and, in the long run, for Israel – I can't imagine a less auspicious forum for belittling any country's artistic accomplishments than a film festival." He concluded: Everyone has a right to disapprove of and even scathingly criticize a country's politics. But I don't see how Israel's artists and its film industry are any more complicit in its treatment of the Palestinians than, well, American artists were complicit in our government's use of torture against suspected terrorists. 

In his complaint to the festival, Greyson asked if "an uncritical celebration of Tel Aviv right now" wasn't akin to "celebrating Montgomery buses in 1963, California grapes in 1969, Chilean wines in 1973 ... or South African fruit in 1991?" 

My answer would be: no way. Wine and grapes and fruit are agricultural products. Films are a product too, for sure, but they are also expressions of art and intellectual ferment. And once you begin to close the door in any way on artistic freedom, even if it simply involves pressuring a film festival to shun a country whose politics you disagree with, you might discover someday that it's a lot easier to shut the door to a free exchange of ideas than it is to open it up again.

A number of Hollywood celebrities circulated a letter on September 15, 2009 protesting a petition calling for a boycott of the Toronto International Film Festival over a Tel Aviv-themed event. The letter, which appeared simultaneously in the Los Angeles Times and the Toronto Star was signed, among others, by Jerry Seinfeld, Sacha Baron Cohen, Natalie Portman, Jason Alexander, Lisa Kudrow, Lenny Kravitz, Patricia Heaton, Jacob Richler, Noah Richler, George F. Walker and Moses Znaimer. The letter said: Anyone who has actually seen recent Israeli cinema, movies that are political and personal, comic and tragic, often critical, knows they are in no way a propaganda arm for any government policy. Blacklisting them only stifles the exchange of cultural knowledge that artists should be the first to defend and protect.

Support
A letter for support for Greyson, termed the Toronto Declaration, was signed by more than 50 people, including Israeli filmmaker Udi Aloni, director Ken Loach, musician David Byrne, actors Danny Glover and Jane Fonda, author Alice Walker and journalist Naomi Klein. The letter argues that:

Fonda would later reconsider her position and released a publicity statement on the matter. "I signed the letter without reading it carefully enough, without asking myself if some of the wording wouldn't exacerbate the situation rather than bring about constructive dialogue," Fonda wrote on the Huffington Post website. She added that the suffering of both sides should be articulated.

Journalist, author and activist Naomi Klein went on to write an op-ed piece in The Globe and Mail, clarifying the intention of the support of Greyson's stance articulated in the Toronto Declaration: "Contrary to the many misrepresentations, the letter is not calling for a boycott of the festival. It is a simple message of solidarity that says: We don't feel like partying with Israel this year."
Greyson's act was termed "courageous" by Judy Rebick who argued that it "is a significant contribution to the Palestinian solidarity movement and the Boycott Divestment and Sanction strategy that it has adopted to shine a light on the inexcusable aggression of Israel against the Palestinian people." Palestinian director Annemarie Jacir, agreed with Greyson's stance and argued that the planned Tel Aviv spotlight will ignore Palestinian filmmakers who live in Tel Aviv and "even more importantly those who are indigenous to that specific area and whose families were exiled and ethnically cleansed from Jaffa/Tel Aviv."

Elle Flanders, a Toronto-based self-described filmmaker who grew up in Israel, also supported Greyson, stating that "We have been accused of politicizing culture but it has been the festival and the Israeli government that has done this." She also stated that the protest was "wildly misconstrued by opposing voices" and that "We in fact defend Israeli filmmakers' rights to screen along with the rest of the festival, rather than as representatives of their government."

 Participation in Gaza Flotilla 
In summer 2011, Greyson traveled to Greece to participate in the Freedom Flotilla II, specifically joining with the "Tahrir," the Canadian member of the Flotilla.

 Arrest in Egypt 
In summer 2013, Greyson traveled to Egypt, where he and Dr. Tarek Loubani, a 33-year-old emergency room doctor from London, Ontario, were detained without charges, in a cell with 38 other people. Reports indicate the two were on their way to Gaza to carry out medical relief work, but were forced to remain in Cairo as the crossing was closed. They remained in detention from August 16 to October 5, 2013.

Greyson's union, the York University Faculty Association, ran a campaign via LabourStart in an effort to force the Egyptian government to release him. Greyson and Loubani began a hunger strike on September 16 to protest their treatment.

The Canadian government announced on October 5 that Greyson and Loubani had been released, however they were unable to board a flight to Frankfurt due to remaining on a no-fly list issued by government prosecutors. On October 10, Greyson and Loubani were cleared for departure and left Egypt for home the next day.

 Personal life 
Greyson is openly gay. His partner is Canadian visual artist Stephen Andrews, who he has lived with since the 1990s. They have been referred to as a "power couple" in Canada's art scene. The Art Gallery of Ontario recently installed a retrospective of Andrews' work exploring AIDS, surveillance, war, memory and chaos theory.

 Awards 
 The University of Toronto's Citizenship Award, for contribution to awareness and education around i  ssues of sexual diversity

 Filmography 

Further reading
Brasell, R. Bruce. "Queer Nationalism and the Musical Fag Bashing of John Greyson's the Making of 'Monsters'." Wide Angle: A Film Quarterly of Theory, Criticism, and Practice 16.3 (1995): 26-36.
Cagle, Robert L. "'Tell the Story of My Life ...': The Making of Meaning, 'Monsters,' and Music in John Greyson's Zero Patience." The Velvet Light Trap 35 (1995): 69-81.
Dellamora, Richard. "John Greyson's 'Zero Patience' in the Canadian Firmament: Cultural practice/cultural Studies." University of Toronto Quarterly 64.4 (1995): 526(10)-536.
Gittings, Christopher E. "Zero Patience, Genre, Difference, and Ideology: Singing and Dancing Queer Nation." Cinema Journal 41.1 (2001): 28-39.
Gittings, Christopher. "Activism and Aesthetics: The Work of John Greyson." Great Canadian Film Directors. Ed. George (ed and introd). Melnyk. Edmonton, AB: U of Alberta P, xviii, 2007. 125-147.
Guthmann, Edward. "John Greyson." The Advocate (The national gay & lesbian newsmagazine).742 (1997): 71(1)-72.
Hallas, Roger. "The Genealogical Pedagogy of John Greyson's Zero Patience." Canadian Journal of Film Studies/Revue Canadienne d'Etudes Cinématographiques 12.1 (2003): 16-37.
Howe, Lawrence. "The Epistemology of Adaptation in John Greyson's Lilies." Canadian Journal of Film Studies/Revue Canadienne d'Etudes Cinématographiques 15.2 (2006): 44-61.
"John Greyson: Filmmaker." Contemporary Canadian Biographies (2000): NA.
Knabe, Susan and Wendy Gay Pearson. 'Zero Patience.' Vancouver: Arsenal Pulp Press, 2011. APP Queer Film Classics Series.
Kotwal, Kaizaad. "An Interview with John Greyson." Film Journal 1.6 (2003): [no pagination].
Loiselle, A. "The Corpse Lies in 'Lilies': The Stage, the Screen, and the Dead Body." .76 (2002).
McGann, Nadine L. "A Kiss is Not a Kiss: An Interview with John Greyson." Afterimage 19.6 (1992): 10(4)-14.
Morris, Gary. "'My Penis! Where is My Penis?' John Greyson's Uncut." Bright Lights Film Journal 24 (1999): (no pagination).
Ramsay, Christine. "Greyson, Grierson, Godard, God: Reflections on the Cinema of John Greyson." North of Everything: English-Canadian Cinema since 1980''. Ed. William (ed and introd). Beard, Jerry (ed and introd). White, and Seth (foreword) Feldman. Edmonton, AB: U of Alberta P, xxiii, 2002. 192-205.

References

External links

1960 births
Film directors from British Columbia
Film directors from London, Ontario
Film directors from Toronto
Canadian gay writers
People from Nelson, British Columbia
LGBT film directors
Living people
Academic staff of York University
Canadian Film Centre alumni
Canadian LGBT screenwriters
20th-century Canadian screenwriters
21st-century Canadian screenwriters
Canadian male screenwriters
Writers from British Columbia
Writers from London, Ontario
Writers from Toronto
Gay screenwriters
21st-century Canadian LGBT people
20th-century Canadian LGBT people